Atholl Brose (or Athol Brose, Athole Brose) is a Scottish drink obtained by mixing oatmeal brose, honey, whisky, and sometimes cream (particularly on festive occasions). Atholl Brose has also become an alternative name for the dessert Cranachan, which uses similar ingredients.

According to legend the drink is named after the 1st Earl of Atholl (of the 8th creation), who suppressed a Highland rebellion in 1475 by spiking the rebel leader's well with Atholl Brose, leading to an inebriated enemy and the rebel leader's capture.

See also 
 Cranachan
 Scottish cuisine
 Diffords Guide

References 
 
 

Scottish cuisine
Scotch whisky